Thomas Caverhill Jerdon publishes the first volume of The Birds of India. 
François Victor Massena, 3rd Duke of Rivoli, Alberto della Marmora and Alfred Moquin-Tandon die.
American ornithologist Greene Smith founds the Greene Smith Museum
Birds described in 1863 include black-throated munia, Amur falcon, Buru monarch, nuthatch vanga, red-tailed wheatear, 
Heinrich Agathon Bernstein discovers the Waigeo home of  Wilson's bird-of-paradise.
 Alfred Russel Wallace publishes The Naturalist on the River Amazons
Gustav Radde Reisen im Süden von Ost-Sibirien in den Jahren 1855-59 (Travels in the south of eastern Siberia during the years 1855–59) published 1862–1863
Ongoing events
John Gould The birds of Australia; Supplement 1851–69. 1 vol. 81 plates; Artists: J. Gould and H. C. Richter; Lithographer: H. C. Richter
John Gould The birds of Asia; 1850-83 7 vols. 530 plates, Artists: J. Gould, H. C. Richter, W. Hart and J. Wolf; Lithographers:H. C. Richter and W. Hart 
The Ibis

References

Bird
Birding and ornithology by year